The Battle of Halys (also known as the Battle of Halys River) took place in 82 BC, during the Second Mithridatic War. Roman general Lucius Licinius Murena became very overconfident while campaigning against Pontus and ignored orders to cease operations there. He commanded two legions (the infamous Fimbrians). Murena launched two raids into Pontic territory. After receiving orders from the Senate not to continue the war, Murena launched a third raid, beginning the Second Mithridatic War. At Halys River, the Romans spared a small Pontic army under general Gordius for too long. Gordius waited until King Mithradates VI arrived himself with the main Pontic army. The Romans were very ill-prepared for the battle. The combined Pontic army attacked the Roman forces on the opposite side of the river. The Mithridatic troops eventually forced their way across, forcing the Romans to retreat. Eventually in 81 B.C. Lucius Cornelius Sulla restored peace between Rome and Pontus.

References 

Mithridatic Wars
80s BC conflicts
82 BC
Battles involving the Roman Republic
Battles involving Pontus